The Mukherjee-Samarth family is a Hindu Bengali-Marathi family that has been involved in the Hindi film industry since the 1930s, Shobhana Samarth having first acted in a film in 1935. The Mukherjee family was connected to the Samarth family by Tanuja's marriage to Shomu Mukherjee in 1973.

Mukherjees
The Mukherjee side of the family is a Bengali Hindu Kulin Brahmin family headed by Sashadhar Mukherjee, described as the founder of Filmalaya studios. Sashadhar was married to Ashok Kumar's sister Satirani Ganguly. Their five sons, Rono Mukherjee, Joy Mukherjee, Deb Mukherjee, Shomu Mukherjee and Shubir Mukherjee followed him into the industry. Rono was the director and composer of a single movie. He is also the father of actress Sharbani Mukherjee. Joy and Deb were both actors. Deb's son is director Ayan Mukerji and daughter Sunita is married to director Ashutosh Gowariker. Shomu became a director and producer. He is the father of actresses Kajol and Tanishaa. Chandana Mukherjee was a scholar of her times. She was the eldest among all the Mukherjee children. She got married into Guha Family, landlords of their times. Shubir is also a producer.

Sashadhar's elder brother was Ravindramohan Mukherjee. His son, Ram Mukherjee, was a film director and one of the founders of Filmalaya Studios. He died on 22 October 2017. He had two children with his wife Krishna Mukerji, the actress Rani Mukerji, and Raja Mukerji who is a producer.

Sashadhar's younger brother, Subodh Mukherjee, was a director. He died on 21 May 2005. He is survived by his wife Kamala, sons Subhash and Sanjay and daughter Gitanjali.

Filmalaya Studios is currently owned by the surviving Mukerji brothers.

Samarths
The Samarth family is a Marathi Chandraseniya Kayastha Prabhu (CKP) family. Their legacy in films began with Rattan Bai, an actress who acted in one Marathi film. Her daughter Shobhna Samarth (1916-2000), was an actress and appeared in films such as Ram Rajya (1943 ) as Sita. Later she acted in supporting role in films like  Love in Simla  (1960), which also featured Joy Mukherjee. Shobhna's husband was the film director Kumarsen Samarth, her cousin, Nalini Jaywant, was also an actress.

Shobna's daughters are Chatura, Tanuja and Nutan. Tanuja and Nutan carried on the family tradition. Tanuja was a moderate success, but it was Nutan (1936–1991) who became a huge star. She holds the record for the most Filmfare awards won for Best Actress along with her niece Kajol.

Tanuja and Nutan's children have also entered the film industry; they are the fourth generation of Samarths to do so. Nutan's son Mohnish Bahl is an actor. Mohnish's daughter Pranutan Bahl is also an actress; Tanuja and Shomu Mukherjee's daughters Kajol and Tanisha are actresses.

Notable current members

Ajay Devgan

Ajay Devgan (born: Vishal Veeru Devgan on 2 April 1969) is Kajol's husband, and also an Indian actor, director, and producer, who has established himself as one of the leading actors of Hindi cinema. Devgan has won numerous awards in his career, including two National Film Awards. He is the son of the late director and action choreographer Veeru Devgan.

Kajol Mukherjee

The daughter of actress Tanuja Samarth and filmmaker Shomu Mukherjee, Kajol is one of the most popular actresses in Hindi cinema. She has won six Filmfare awards among them five for Best Actress and one for Best Villain. She was the first woman to win the Filmfare best villain award. She has numerous blockbusters and hits to her name such as Baazigar (1993), Dilwale Dulhania Le Jayenge (1995), Gupt: The Hidden Truth (1997), Ishq (1997), Pyaar To Hona Hi Tha (1998), Kuch Kuch Hota Hai (1998), Kabhi Khushi Kabhi Gham (2001) and Fanaa (2006). Her films with Shah Rukh Khan have been huge hits.

Kajol is married to actor Ajay Devgn; the couple has a daughter, Nysa, and a son, Yug. For a few years, she focused on her marriage and motherhood, sidelining films. Her comeback film Fanaa (2006)  with Aamir Khan was hugely successful as was her 2010 release My Name is Khan. She has also acted in her husband's directorial debut U Me Aur Hum (2008).

Her younger sister Tanishaa Mukerji, aunt Nutan, grandmother Shobhna, great-grandmother Rattan Bai and cousins Sharbani, Mohnish and Rani are also actors in Hindi cinema, while another cousin, Ayan, is a director, and grandfather, Kumarsen, was a poet.

Rani Mukerji

Rani Mukerji is also one of the most popular actresses in Hindi cinema. Rani is the daughter of filmmaker Ram Mukherjee and playback singer Krishna Mukherjee. Her brother is producer Raja Mukherjee. She has worked with Kajol in the 1998 hit Kuch Kuch Hota Hai. Rani has been nominated for and won various awards. She won seven Filmfare awards and among them two for Best Actress, two for Best Actress (Critics) and three for Best Actress in Supporting Role. She is the first and only actress to receive Best Actress and Best Actress in Supporting Role awards in the same year (50th Filmfare Award) as well as Best Actress and Best Actress (Critics) in the same year (51st Filmfare Award). As an actress, she won the highest number of Filmfare Awards. She is best known for her performance in 2005 cult classic Black for which she won several awards. She has several blockbusters to her credit such as Ghulam (1998), Saathiya (2002), Chalte Chalte (2003), Hum Tum (2004), Veer-Zaara (2004), Bunty Aur Babli (2005) Kabhi Alvida Naa Kehna (2006) and No One Killed Jessica (2011). Rani is married to film director, producer, screenwriter and distributor Aditya Chopra. Her comeback women centric films Mardaani (2014), Hichki (2018) and Mardaani 2 (2019) were also successful.

Aditya Chopra

Aditya Chopra is an Indian film director and producer, and the CEO of the Yash Raj Films. He is the son of director and producer Yash Chopra and comes from the Chopra-Johar family. He married Rani Mukerji in 2014. He is the director of Dilwale Dulhaniya Le Jayenge, Mohabbatein and Rab Ne Bana Di Jodi for which he won numerous awards including Filmfare Awards and National Awards. Chopra's cousins Karan Johar and Vidhu Vinod Chopra are also notable members of his family.

Mohnish Bahl

Mohnish Bahl is an Indian actor working in the Indian film industry and on Indian television. He is a member of the Mukherjee-Samarth family. His parents were actress Nutan and Rajnish Bahl, a lieutenant commander in the Indian Navy. He is the grandson of actress Shobhna and poet Kumarsen, great-grandson of actress Rattan Bai, nephew of actress Tanuja and cousin of actresses Kajol and Tanishaa Mukerji. A frequent collaborator of Sooraj Barjatya, Bahl has appeared in Barjatya's blockbusters Maine Pyar Kiya (1989), Hum Aapke Hain Koun..! (1994), Hum Saath-Saath Hain (1999), and Vivah (2006).

Ayan Mukerji

Ayan Mukerji, born in Kolkata, West Bengal, is an Indian film director. He is the son of actor Deb Mukherjee, made his directorial debut with Karan Johar produced Wake Up Sid (2009), and won the Filmfare Award for Best Debut Director. He directed his next film, the highly successful Yeh Jawaani Hai Deewani in 2013. His most ambitious and Bollywood's most anticipated film Brahmāstra: Part One- Shiva released on 9 September 2022.

Ashutosh Gowariker

Ashutosh Gowariker is an Indian film director, actor, writer and producer, known for films such as Lagaan (2001), Swades (2004) and Jodhaa Akbar (2008) among others. He is married to Sunita, former actor Deb Mukherjee's daughter from his first marriage.

Pranutan Bahl

Pranutan Bahl is an Indian actress and daughter of actors Mohnish Bahl and Ekta Sohini. She is known for films including Notebook (2019) and Helmet (2021).

References

Bollywood film clans
Bengali Hindus
Indian families
Hindu families
Bengali families